Iyatiku is the corn goddess of the Keresan Puebloes. From Shipap, her underground realm, humanity first emerged, from there infants today are born and tither go the dead.
To provide food for them, she plants bits of her heart in fields to the north, west, south, and east. Later the pieces of Iyatiku's heart grow into fields of corn.
The Cochiti Puebloes regard Mesewi as the hero who had led the ancestors of the tribe out of Shipap.

She is associated with compassion, agriculture, and children.
Her symbols are Beans, Cavern, Corn, Seeds and Soil.
She has no Totem Animal.

External links 
GodChecker.com – IYATIKU: Underground Corn Goddess

Goddesses of the indigenous peoples of North America
Agricultural goddesses
Childhood goddesses